Xichou County is under the administration of the Wenshan Zhuang and Miao Autonomous Prefecture, in the southeast of Yunnan province, China.

Administrative divisions
In the present, Xichou County has 2 towns and 7 townships. 
2 towns
 Xisa
 Xingjie
7 townships

Ethnic groups
The Xichou County Gazetteer of 1996 lists the following ethnic subgroups.

Han
Zhuang
Miao
Yao
Yi
Luoluo 倮倮
Flowery Luo 花倮
White Luo 白倮
Black Luo 黑倮
Chinese Luo 汉倮
Pula 朴喇
Mengwu 孟乌
Mongol

Transport
Nearest airport: Wenshan Airport

Climate

References

External links
Xichou County Official Website

County-level divisions of Wenshan Prefecture